Grocholice may refer to the following places:
Grocholice, Poddębice County in Łódź Voivodeship (central Poland)
Grocholice, Gmina Lipnik in Świętokrzyskie Voivodeship (south-central Poland)
Grocholice, Gmina Sadowie in Świętokrzyskie Voivodeship (south-central Poland)